Donald Williams may refer to:

Donald Williams (politician) (1919–1990), British Conservative Party politician
Donald E. Williams (1942–2016), NASA astronaut
Donald E. Williams Jr. (born 1957), member of the Connecticut General Assembly
Donald Williams (basketball) (born 1973), American basketball player
Duck Williams (Donald Edgar Williams, born 1956), American basketball player for the New Orleans Jazz
Donald Williams (field hockey) (born 1966), British former field hockey player
Donald Cary Williams (1899–1983), American philosopher and a professor at both the University of California Los Angeles and at Harvard University

See also
Don Williams (disambiguation)
List of people with surname Williams